Eureka Productions is an Australian-American television production company majority-owned by Fremantle. Launched in 2016 by former Endemol Shine Australia executives Chris Culvenor and Paul Franklin with backing from Fremantle, the company primarily develops and produces non-scripted and reality programming in Australia and the United States.

History
The company was formed by Chris Culvenor and Paul Franklin, both executives with Endemol Shine Australia, setting up Los Angeles and Sydney offices in 2016. The company also formed a partnership with Fremantle to co-produce international projects, with the studio taking an investment in Eureka. In 2018, Eureka signed a deal with Lionsgate to be the exclusive distributor and producer of Lionsgate entertainment and unscripted series in Australia.

In 2021, Fremantle acquired a majority stake in Eureka. In 2022, Fremantle restructured its Australian operations, placing Eureka in charge of its non-scripted and reality output in the country, and Fremantle Australia under CEO Greg Woods focusing primarily on scripted dramas and factual programming.

Productions 
 Programs with a shaded background indicate the program is still in production.

References

External links
 

RTL Group
Television production companies of Australia
Australian companies established in 2016
Mass media companies established in 2016
Companies based in Sydney
Privately held companies of Australia
Television production companies of the United States
Companies based in Los Angeles